The Yasser Arafat Cup is an association football cup competition held for football clubs in the West Bank. The cup is overseen by the Palestine Football Association and was founded in 2011. The cup is named after Yasser Arafat, the president of the Palestinian National Authority who died in 2004.

References 

Football competitions in the State of Palestine